A-class lifeboats are a series of lifeboats operated by the Royal National Lifeboat Institution (RNLI):

Boats in this series include:
 , an RNLI lifeboat class using the Dell Quay Dory
 , an RNLI lifeboat class constructed from GRP
 , an RNLI lifeboat class using Boston Whalers

Royal National Lifeboat Institution lifeboats
Ship classes